Sternotomini is a tribe of longhorn beetles of the subfamily Lamiinae. It was described by Thomson in 1860.

Taxonomy
 Anatragoides Breuning, 1938
 Cylindrothorax Aurivillius, 1915
 Demagogus Thomson, 1868
 Freadelpha Thomson, 1868
 Mimotragocephala Breuning, 1971
 Pinacosterna Harold, 1879
 Pseudoharpya Breuning, 1935
 Pterochaos Thomson, 1868
 Stellognatha Dejean, 1835
 Sternoharpya Aurivillius, 1913
 Sternotomis Percheron, 1836
 Zographus Dejean, 1835

References

 
Lamiinae